Rob Flack is a Canadian politician, who was elected to the Legislative Assembly of Ontario in the 2022 provincial election. He represents the riding of Elgin—Middlesex—London as a member of the Progressive Conservative Party of Ontario.

Flack had previously run for the Conservative Party of Canada in the 2021 Canadian federal election in London West.

References 

Living people
Progressive Conservative Party of Ontario MPPs
21st-century Canadian politicians
Candidates in the 2021 Canadian federal election
Conservative Party of Canada candidates for the Canadian House of Commons
People from Middlesex County, Ontario
Year of birth missing (living people)